Bold indicates chief judge or chief justice. The Ohio Supreme Court was created by the Ohio Constitution of 1802 with three judges, and had three or four through 1851. In 1851, the number of judges was increased to five. In 1892, the number of judges was increased to six. In 1912, the office of chief justice was created and the total number of judges was increased to seven (including the chief justice). In 1968, all the supreme court judges were re-titled as justice.

See also:
 List of Ohio politicians
 Ohio Supreme Court elections

Chief justices

Chief judges (1803–1845)

Chief justices (since 1913)

1803 to 1851

1852 to 1892 

All terms under the first Constitution terminated the second Monday in February, 1852, when the terms of judges elected Autumn, 1851 under the new Constitution commenced.

1893 to 1912

1913 to present

Supreme Court Commission

In 1875, the Constitution of Ohio was amended to provide for the Supreme Court Commission. The amendment reads in part: "A commission, which shall consist of five members, shall be appointed by the governor, with the advice and consent of the Senate, the members of which shall hold office for the term of three years from and after the first day of February, 1876, to dispose of such part of the business then on the dockets of the Supreme Court, as shall, by arrangement between said commission and said court, be transferred to such commission; and said commission shall have like jurisdiction and power in respect to such business as are or may be vested in said court; and the members of said commission shall receive a like compensation for the time being, with the judges of said court."

Commission of 1876
On February 2, 1876, Ohio Governor Rutherford B. Hayes appointed the following six members:
Josiah Scott of Crawford County
William Wartenbee Johnson of Lawrence County
D. Thew Wright of Hamilton County
Richard A. Harrison of Franklin County
Henry C. Whitman of Hamilton County
Luther Day of Portage County

Harrison refused the appointment, and Thomas Q. Ashburn of Clermont County was seated March 16, 1878. The commission sat until February 2, 1879, and "assisted in bringing up the docket which had fallen behind the reasonable time for trial."

Commission of 1883
Governor Charles Foster appointed another commission of four men, which served from April 17, 1883 to April 16, 1885.
George K. Nash of Franklin County
Franklin J. Dickman of Cuyahoga County
Charles D. Martin of Fairfield County
John McCauley of Seneca County

References

Further reading

 
Judges of the Supreme Court
Ohio